KSEM (106.3 FM) is a radio station licensed to Seminole, Texas. The station broadcasts a country music format and is owned by Gaines County Broadcasting, LLC.

References

External links
KSEM's official website

SEM
Country radio stations in the United States